The Edsall-class destroyer escorts were destroyer escorts built primarily for ocean antisubmarine escort service during World War II. The lead ship, was commissioned on 10 April 1943 at Orange, Texas. The class was also known as the FMR type from their Fairbanks-Morse reduction-geared diesel drive, with a type of engine used in the submarines of the time.  The FMR's substitution for a diesel-electric power plant was the essential difference from the predecessor  ("DET") class. This was the only World War II destroyer escort class in which all the ships originally ordered were completed as United States Navy destroyer escorts. Destroyer escorts were regular companions escorting the vulnerable cargo ships. Late in the war, plans were made to replace the  guns with  guns, but only  was refitted (after a collision). In total, all 85 were completed by two shipbuilding companies: Consolidated Steel Corporation, Orange, Texas (47), and Brown Shipbuilding, Houston, Texas (38). Most were en route to the Pacific Theater when Japan surrendered. One of the ships participated in Operation Dragoon and two were attacked by German guided missiles.

Hull numbers
A total of 85 Edsall-class destroyer escorts were built.

DE-129 through DE-152 Consolidated Steel Corporation, Orange, Texas
DE-238 through DE-255 Brown Shipbuilding, Houston, Texas
DE-316 through DE-338 Consolidated Steel Corporation, Orange, Texas
DE-382 through DE-401 Brown Shipbuilding, Houston, Texas

Fate

Destroyed or damaged in combat
 – torpedoed 20 April 1944 by U-371 off Algiers, damaged
 – damaged 11 April 1944 off Algiers by German aircraft

Transferred to US Coast Guard from 1951 to 1954

 – redesignated WDE-422
 – redesignated WDE-424
 – redesignated WDE-425
 – redesignated WDE-428
 – redesignated WDE-431
 – redesignated WDE-434
 – redesignated WDE-482
 – redesignated WDE-485
 – redesignated WDE-487
 – redesignated WDE-488
 – redesignated WDE-489
 – redesignated WDE-491

Transferred to other countries
 – transferred to the Mexican Navy as Comodoro Manuel Azueta (A06), last of class in active service (decommissioned 2015)
 – transferred to South Vietnam as Tran Hung Dao. Later, to Philippines as 
 – transferred to Tunisia
 – transferred to South Vietnam as Tran Khanh Du. Later, captured by North Vietnam and used as training vessel

Notable ships of class
  sister ship of USS Pope. Was in TG 22.3 with Pope and participated in the capture of U-boat .
  Participated in the sinking of U-boat .
  was in Task Force 22.3 that was centered on escort carrier , which captured German U-boat U-505.
  was in TG 22.3 with Pope, Pillsbury and Chatelain and participated in the capture of U-505.
  and  each received a Navy Unit Commendation for action during the Anzio campaign.
  sank 5 German U-boats and awarded Presidential Unit Citation, 7 battle stars.
  was in TG 22.3 with Pope and Pillsbury and participated in the capture of U-505.
  – the sole surviving example of the Edsall-class; a museum ship in Galveston, Texas.
  received a Navy Unit Commendation for action three days after the war ended.
  won two battle stars in a single engagement sinking two U-boats with the USS Frost (DE-144).

Ships in Class

References

External links

List of Edsall Class Destroyer Escorts
 USS Fessenden DE/DER-142
Destroyers OnLine: The Destroyer Escorts
Edsall class at Destroyer History Foundation

 
Ships transferred from the United States Navy to the United States Coast Guard